Vladimir Terzija is an electrical engineer at the University of Manchester, England. He was named a Fellow of the Institute of Electrical and Electronics Engineers (IEEE) in 2016 for his contributions to power system protection.

References 

Fellow Members of the IEEE
Living people
Academics of the University of Manchester
British electrical engineers
Serbian engineers
Year of birth missing (living people)